Casas de Don Pedro, meaning 'Lord Peter's houses', is a municipality located in the province of Badajoz, Extremadura, Spain. According to the 2014 census, the municipality has a population of 1559 inhabitants.

History
At the time of the Spanish Civil War the Francoist concentration camp of Casa Zaldívar, where Spanish Republican military personnel were interned and where many were shot, was located in a cortijo of this municipality.

See also
La Siberia

References

External links

SBHAC - Biografía: Andrés Barrero Rodríguez

Municipalities in the Province of Badajoz